George Frew (9 September 1883 – 6 April 1942) was a Scotland international rugby union player. He played as a Forward position.

Rugby Union career

Amateur career

Frew played for Glasgow HSFP. He was also capped by the Barbarians.

Provincial career

He was capped by Glasgow District in 1906.

He played for the Blues Trial side against the Whites Trial side on 21 January 1911 while still with Glasgow HSFP.

International career

Frew was capped by Scotland 15 times. He captained the Scotland side against Wales in 1910.

References

1883 births
1942 deaths
Barbarian F.C. players
Blues Trial players
Glasgow District (rugby union) players
Glasgow HSFP players
Rugby union players from Larkhall
Scotland international rugby union players
Scottish rugby union players
Rugby union forwards